Dominion Stores may refer to:

Dominion (supermarket), a former national chain in Canada, more recently operating only in the Greater Toronto Area, with the remaining locations rebranded as Metro in 2008
Dominion Stores (Newfoundland), a division of the Loblaw Companies which continues to operate in Newfoundland and Labrador, Canada, separated from the national chain since 1987